Ponte do Pedrido is a bridge in the Province of A Coruña, Galicia, Spain. It was built between 1939 and 1942. The 520.4 metre bridge connects Bergondo to Paderne.

References

Bridges in Galicia (Spain)
Buildings and structures in the Province of A Coruña
Bridges completed in 1942
1942 establishments in Spain